Rockwood Summit High School (also known as Summit High School) is a public high school in Fenton, Missouri that is part of the Rockwood School District. Summit opened in 1993 on the same day as Marquette High School, another Rockwood high school.

History
In early 1992, Rockwood School District determined the necessity of constructing two new high schools to serve an expanding population. After voting to build the schools in March 1992, the Rockwood Board of Education unanimously voted to name the new southeast high school as Rockwood Summit High School. In May 1992, the board named Tom Hensley as the first principal of the school, and construction began that summer according to designs by the William B. Ittner architectural firm. Rock blasting was required to construct the building, which increased the cost by $207,000. The original estimate for the building was $17 million; the total cost of the building upon completion was $22.7 million, although the school was built with a combined cafeteria and theater to save $2.5 million. Among the $22.7 million cost of the building, costs for the pool facilities were $400,000, roofing and sheet metal were $780,000, masonry was $995,000, and data and voice networks were $200,000. When built, Summit featured a two-story commons and atrium, 77 classrooms, several computer labs, and art, music and theater facilities. The school opened on September 7, 1993, on the same day as Marquette High School, which was the first time that a school district in the St. Louis area had opened two new high schools on the same day. It opened with 635 9th and 10th grade students.

In 1998, Summit's first principal, Tom Hensley, retired after 26 years in the district; his replacement, Larry Berneking, transferred from Eureka High School. In 1999, the school became the first in the St. Louis area to sponsor an equestrian club; in its first year, the club started with a dozen members and offered a variety of activities to learn about horseback riding.

Within five years of its opening, the school district received approval for a bond issue to provide an auditorium and additional classrooms at Summit during the 1998–1999 school year. According to a construction manager, the Summit addition included 34,000 square feet of new space (six classrooms on two floors) for $2.7 million, and its auditorium was completed during the winter of 1999. As with the original building, the plans for the addition were completed by William B. Ittner, Inc., and the new auditorium and office space created a courtyard in front of the school. Summit also gained 120 parking spaces. During the expansion, five boys from the nearby middle school vandalised the building, destroying drywall, throwing equipment into an orchestra pit, and pouring roofing glue on plumbing. The vandalism delayed the opening of the new wing by two weeks. An additional five years later, in 2003, the parking lots and gymnasium floor were replaced at a cost of roughly $1.3 million.

In early 2003, a group of conservative students began publishing an underground newspaper after they felt that the school newspaper was unresponsive to their needs. The underground paper courted controversy when it published stories arguing in favor of an immediate invasion of Iraq, against the desegregation program, and a comparison of abortion with the Holocaust. The abortion story also included "graphic photos of dismembered babies", and one student told the story's author that the photographs were "disgusting" given that the paper was distributed during lunch. The newspaper also was published online. In 2007, a bomb threat resulted in cancelled classes, while in 2008, vandalism led administrators to cancel the homecoming dance.

Recognitions and achievements
Summit was named by Newsweek magazine as one of America's top public high schools in 2006, 2008, 2010, and 2011.

Social studies teacher Jamie Manker was crowned "Missouri Teacher of the Year" for 2014.

The RSHS newspaper has received the George H. Gallup Award seven times.

The Yearbook has received the National Scholastic Press Association All American Award six times.

Enrollment and Demographics 
As of the 20182019 school year, Rockwood Summit has an enrollment of about 1,298 students.

Current status 
As of the 2018–2019 school year, Summit operates on an 8:28 am to 3:17 pm schedule. Serving since 2018, its principal is Emily McCown.

Activities
For the 2018–2019 school year, the school offered 29 activities approved by the Missouri State High School Activities Association (MSHSAA):

Baseball
Boys and girls basketball
Robotics
Cheerleading
Boys and girls cross country
Dance and pom-pom team
Field hockey
Football
Boys and girls golf
Girls lacrosse
Band, orchestra and vocal music
Scholar bowl
Step Team
Boys and girls soccer
Softball
Speech and debate
Boys and girls swimming and diving
Boys and girls tennis
Boys and girls track and field
Boys and girls volleyball
Water polo
Winter guard
Wrestling

 In addition to its current activities, Summit athletic teams have won ten team state championships, including:
Girls Softball: 1998, 2006
Dance Team: 2011
Boys Baseball: 2012
Cheerleading: 2015
Boys Soccer: 2016, 2019
Boys Track and Field: 2017
Girls Soccer: 2018 
Girls Lacrosse: 2019
The school also has produced various individual state champions in track and field and wrestling.

Demographics

Notable people

Alumni
Brandon Williams: defensive tackle for Kansas City Chiefs, selected in third round of 2013 NFL Draft
Josh Arnold, host on The Bob & Tom Show
Ben Miller: PowerlifterUSAPL State record holder. Current Strength Coach
Jackson Rutledge: Drafted 17th overall in 2019 Major League Baseball draft by the Washington Nationals

References

High schools in St. Louis County, Missouri
Educational institutions established in 1993
School buildings completed in 1993
Public high schools in Missouri
1993 establishments in Missouri
Buildings and structures in St. Louis County, Missouri